The group stage of the 1996–97 UEFA Champions League began on 11 September 1996 and ended on 4 December 1996. Eight teams qualified automatically for the group stage, while eight more qualified via a preliminary round. The 16 teams were divided into four groups of four, and the teams in each group played against each other on a home-and-away basis, meaning that each team played a total of six group matches. For each win, teams were awarded three points, with one point awarded for each draw. At the end of the group stage, the two teams in each group with the most points advanced to the quarter-finals.

Group A

Group B

Group C

Manchester United's defeat to Fenerbahce at Old Trafford was their first home defeat in European football.

Group D

Group Stage
UEFA Champions League group stages